Southwest Township may refer to:

Southwest Township, Crawford County, Illinois
Southwest Township, Lenoir County, North Carolina
Southwest Township, Sargent County, North Dakota
Southwest Township, Warren County, Pennsylvania

Township name disambiguation pages